The tapetum is a specialised layer of nutritive cells found within the anther, of flowering plants, where it is located between the sporangenous tissue and the anther wall.
Tapetum is important for the nutrition and development of pollen grains, as well as a source of precursors for the pollen coat. The cells are usually bigger and normally have more than one nucleus per cell. As the sporogenous cells undergo mitosis, the nuclei of tapetal cells also divide. Sometimes, this mitosis is not normal due to which many cells of mature tapetum become multinucleate. Sometimes polyploidy and polyteny can also be seen. The unusually large nuclear constitution of the tapetum helps it in providing nutrients and regulatory molecules to the forming pollen grains. The following processes are responsible for this:
 Endomitosis
 Normal mitosis not followed by cytokinesis
 Formation of restitution nuclei
 Endoreduplication

Tapetum helps in pollenwall formation, transportation of nutrients to inner side of anther, synthesis of callase enzyme for separation of microspore tetrads.

Types of tapetum 
Two main tapetum types are recognised, secretory (glandular) and plasmodial (amoeboid). In the secretory type a layer of tapetal cells remains around the anther locule, while in the plasmodial type the tapetal cell walls dissolve and their protoplasts fuse to form a multinucleate plasmodium. A third, less common type, the invasive non-syncytial tapetum has been described in Canna, where the tapetal cell walls break down to invade the anther locule but do not fuse to form a plasmodium. 

Amongst the monocots Acorales, the first branching clade has a secretory tapetum, while the other alismatid clade, Alismatales are predominantly plasmodial. Amongst the late branching clades, the lilioid monocots are nearly all secretory while the commelinid monocots are diverse with respect to tapetal pattern.

References

Bibliography 

 

Plant anatomy